Nicolás Esteban Fernández Muñoz (born 3 August 1999) is a Chilean footballer who plays for Audax Italiano.

International career
At under-20 level, Fernández represented Chile in the 2018 South American Games, winning the gold medal,

Honours
Chile U20
 South American Games Gold medal: 2018

References

1999 births
Living people
Chilean footballers
Chile under-20 international footballers
Chilean Primera División players
Audax Italiano footballers
Association football defenders
South American Games gold medalists for Chile
South American Games medalists in football
Competitors at the 2018 South American Games
Place of birth missing (living people)